Alan Wilson (born 2 November 1939) is a former Australian rules footballer who played for the Fitzroy Football Club in the Victorian Football League (VFL).

Notes

External links 
		

Living people
1939 births
Australian rules footballers from Victoria (Australia)
Fitzroy Football Club players